Samarova is a rural locality (a village) in Oktyabrsky District of Perm Krai, Russia.

A hydrogen sulfide rill known as Manchebay flows between Ishimovo and Samarova. According to the local lore, an elder healer known as Mukhamak used to live here. An old wooden barrel in which visitors bathed is all that remains to corroborate this story.

References

Rural localities in Perm Krai
Oktyabrsky District, Perm Krai